"One (Always Hardcore)" is a song by German musical group Scooter. It was released in December 2004 as the third single from their 2004 album Mind The Gap. The radio edit is a remix of the song's album version, featuring more elaborate instrumental bridges.

Track listing
CD Single
"One (Always Hardcore)" [Radio Edit] (3:49)
"One (Always Hardcore)" [Club Mix] (7:16)
"One (Always Hardcore)" [Extended] (5:28)
"Circle of Light" (4:20)

12"
"One (Always Hardcore)" [Extended] (5:28)
"One (Always Hardcore)" [Club Mix] (7:16)

Download
"One (Always Hardcore)" [Radio Edit] (3:49)
"One (Always Hardcore)" [Club Mix] (7:16)
"One (Always Hardcore)" [Extended] (5:28)

Music video
The video for "One (Always Hardcore)" was shot in the tunnel of the Elbe River in Hamburg, Germany. Footage from a concert is also featured, as well as scenes shot on a beach of lead singer H. P. Baxxter driving a Jaguar V-12 E-Type 1973 and a Mark 2 1961. It was directed by Andreas Bardét and Tim Tibor.

Samples
"One (Always Hardcore)" is partially a cover of "Always Hardcore" by Neophyte, which itself is based on the chorus refrain of "Alive" by Pearl Jam, taken from the 1991 album Ten. The Radio Edit also contains a sample from "Move on Baby" by Italian Eurodance group Cappella.

Chart performance

Weekly charts

Year-end charts

References

Scooter (band) songs
2004 singles
Songs written by H.P. Baxxter
Songs written by Jens Thele
Songs written by Rick J. Jordan
2004 songs